The Three Steps to Victory is a greyhound racing competition held annually at Owlerton Stadium in Sheffield. 

It was inaugurated in 2003 and is unique in the racing calendar because it consists of different race distances. In 2019 Gain Nutrition took over the sponsorship of the event.

Past winners

Venues & Distances
2003–2004 (Sheffield 280, 480, 500m)
2010–2022 (Sheffield 480, 500, 660m)

Sponsors
2010–2010 (Molson Coors Brewing Company)
2011–2011 (Carling)
2014–2014 (Coors Light)
2015–2016 (Pinpoint Recruitment)
2017–2017 (Molson Coors Brewing Company)
2018–2018 (Greyhound Media Group (GMG))
2019–2022 (Gain Nutrition)

References

Greyhound racing competitions in the United Kingdom
Sports competitions in Sheffield
Sport in Sheffield
Recurring sporting events established in 2003